The following is a list of borough presidents of the five boroughs of New York City.

Manhattan 

 Before 1874, when it annexed part of the Bronx, New York City was the same as the present Borough of Manhattan. For New York's mayors before 1898, see List of mayors of New York City.

The Bronx

Brooklyn

Queens

Richmond/Staten Island 

The Borough of Richmond was renamed the Borough of Staten Island in 1975. The county is still named Richmond County.

See also 

 Borough president

References

Government of New York City
New York City-related lists